The Lishan Culture Museum is a museum in Lishan Village, Heping District, Taichung, Taiwan.

History
The museum was established in 1971.

Architecture
The museum is housed in a 2-story building. Behind the museum building lies a green maple forest.

Exhibitions
The museum displays the history of Central Cross-Island Highway construction, culture of Atayal people and the nature of Lishan.

Transportation
The museum is accessible by bus from Hualien City, Taichung or Yilan City.

See also
 List of museums in Taiwan

References

1971 establishments in Taiwan
Museums established in 1971
Museums in Taichung